Zhou Ang ( 190s) was a Chinese military general and politician serving under the warlord Yuan Shao during the late Eastern Han dynasty of China. He was from Kuaiji Commandery, which is around present-day Shaoxing, Zhejiang. He had two brothers: Zhou Yu (Renming) and Zhou Xin. He served as the Administrator (太守) of Jiujiang Commandery (九江郡; around present-day Quanjiao County, Anhui) and as the Inspector (刺史) of Yu Province. In 192, he was defeated in a battle at Yinling County (陰陵縣; northwest of present-day Changfeng County, Anhui) against the forces of Yuan Shao's half-brother and rival Yuan Shu.

In historical records, Zhou Ang is often confused with his two brothers. For example, historical records claim that he was involved in the Battle of Yangcheng in 191 against the warlord Sun Jian (Yuan Shu's ally) when it was actually his brother Zhou Yu (Renming).

See also
 Lists of people of the Three Kingdoms

References

 Chen, Shou (3rd century). Records of the Three Kingdoms (Sanguozhi).
 
 Fan, Ye (5th century). Book of the Later Han (Houhanshu).
 Pei, Songzhi (5th century). Annotations to Records of the Three Kingdoms (Sanguozhi zhu).

2nd-century births
Year of death unknown
Generals under Yuan Shao
Han dynasty generals from Zhejiang
Han dynasty politicians from Zhejiang
Politicians from Shaoxing